The battle of Avdiivka is an ongoing military engagement between the Russian Armed Forces and Donbas Separatist Forces on one side and the Ukrainian Armed Forces on the other. It is being fought over the city of Avdiivka, located in the Donbas region. Fighting started when violence erupted in the Donbas again on 21 February 2022, when Russian president Vladimir Putin recognized the Donetsk People's Republic. Days later, when Russia invaded Ukraine, Avdiivka was among the first places to be attacked.

Background 
Avdiivka has been at the front lines of the Russo-Ukrainian War since 2015. It was the site of the 2017 battle of Avdiivka, resulting in destruction in the town, though Ukrainian forces still held it.

Battle

Early fighting (21 February – 17 April 2022) 
On 21 February 2022, it was reported that Russian troops were aiding the separatists in Avdiivka.

When Russia officially started its invasion of Ukraine, Avdiivka was one of its main targets. On 13 March, Russian forces bombed the Avdiivka Coke Plant and it was reported on 25 March that Artem Murakhovskyi, a commander of the Azov Battalion, was killed in Avdiivka.

Escalation (18 April – 27 July 2022) 
On 18 April, Russia renewed its invasion on Eastern Ukraine by heavily shelling and attacking Avdiivka. Around 2,000 of Avdiivka's residents were forced to flee underground.

During the battle, use of white phosphorus munitions by Russian forces was reported several times. Governor of Donetsk Oblast Pavlo Kyrylenko reported a phosphorus attack on the city industrial zone on 26 March, on the area of the coking plant on 26 April, and on the city center, causing several fires, the next day. On 18 May, Avdiivka 1st school was destroyed by a Russian attack with phosphorus munitions. On 29 April, videos of the Russian army shelling Ukrainian forces in Avdiivka with a thermobaric weapon were published.

On May 26, Ukraine's General Staff reported that Russian forces were advancing through Avdiivka, capturing many areas in the city.

On 1 June, the DPR took control of a major highway.  On 6 June, the DPR took territory near Kamianka.  On 12 June, Russia again bombed the Avdiivka Coke Plant.  School No. 6 was destroyed on 21 June, being the third school destroyed in Avdiivka.  On 24 June, Russian forces fired on Avdiivka.

Russian forces later captured Novoselivka Druha on 4 July, which is 10 km northeast of Avdiivka, in an attempt to encircle the city.  On 7 July, Russian forces shelled Avdiivka for 24 hours.  They hit infrastructure, a hospital, residential buildings, a bus depot, and the Avdiivka Coke Plant.

On 18 July, the DPR claimed it had "half-surrounded" Avdiivka, having blocked two of the roads leading into the town. The ISW also stated that fighting north of Avdiivka had intensified on July 18.

Renewed assaults (28 July 2022 – present) 
On 28 July, DPR and Russian forces launched a claimed offensive to surround Avdiivka. Russian and separatist forces assaulted the towns of Krasnohorivka, Pisky, and other towns north of Avdiivka, with unspecified gains. On 31  July, the Ukrainian General Staff reported that Russian forces attempted advances around Kamyanka and Pisky and that unspecified separate Russian units had ”partial success” around Avdiivka. Donetsk People‘s Republic (DPR) Deputy Information Minister Daniil Bezsonov claimed that Russian and DPR forces secured positions on the southeastern outskirts of Pisky, which is consistent with Ukrainian reports.  The Head of the Avdiivka City Military Administration Vitalii Barabash said that only 10% of the pre-war population of Avdiivka remained or about 2,500 people.

Ukraine said on 5 August that it lost the Butivka coal mine to Russia and claimed it was pushed to the outskirts of Avdiivka.  The DPR claimed its forces and Russia took Pisky, with Ukraine rejecting the claim. On August 7, combat footage showed that Russian forces had reached the centre of Pisky. As of August 12, the ISW reported that based on combat footage and satellite imagery, much of Pisky had been leveled by the Russians, because of heavy shelling using thermobaric artillery systems. The Russian defence ministry claimed to have fully captured Pisky by 14 August, but the Ukrainian military denied that it had been captured, saying fights were still ongoing.

On 24 August, Russian and DNR forces captured Pisky. In early September, several separatist units, including the Sparta Battalion and Somalia Battalion, launched an attack in the wider Avdiivka area, most importantly near Pisky. As of late September, the Wall Street Journal reported that Ukrainian forces "remain[ed] on the defensive" in Avdiivka.  On 10 October, Ukraine said Russia was continuing its offensive in Avdiivka and was trying to encircle the city.

Casualties 

50 civilians have been killed and wounded in the city since the start of the invasion.

On 8 April, one person was killed and another injured by Russian shelling. On 13 April, one civilian was killed and 12 were wounded in Avdiivka. On 2 May, three civilians were killed due to Russian bombardment. On 3 May 2022, according to a news article on Dutch outlet Nos.nl, at least 10 people died and 15 more were injured during an attack on a coking plant. Allegedly, the attack took place after the workers had finished work and were waiting for the bus.  On 23 May, Russian shelling and artillery bombarded Avdiivka all night long.  Three civilians were injured and 20 houses as well as a kindergarten were damaged severely.  On 30 May, one civilian was killed during a street fight in Avdiivka. 2 civilians were killed on June 12.  On 5 July, 2 civilians were killed in Avdiivka. One civilian was killed and two wounded on 7 July.  One civilian was killed on 6 August. On 12 October 7 civilians were killed and 12 more were injured after a Russian shelling of the city market.

See also 
 Outline of the Russo-Ukrainian War

Notes

References

Avdiivka
Avdiivka
Avdiivka
February 2022 events in Ukraine
March 2022 events in Ukraine
April 2022 events in Ukraine
May 2022 events in Ukraine
June 2022 events in Ukraine
July 2022 events in Ukraine
August 2022 events in Ukraine
Avdiivka
History of Donetsk Oblast
Avdiivka
Avdiivka_(2022-2023)
September 2022 events in Ukraine
October 2022 events in Ukraine
November 2022 events in Ukraine
December 2022 events in Ukraine
January 2023 events in Ukraine